Chen Zhonghe (born 2 October 1957 in Zhangzhou) is a Chinese former volleyball coach. He was the head coach of the Chinese women's national volleyball team from 2001 to 2009 and the man behind the gold medals of the 2003 FIVB Volleyball Women's World Cup and the 2004 Athens Olympics.

Huang Bo and Peng Yuchang starred as him in the 2020 film Leap. Chen himself was outraged by the somewhat negative portrayal and threatened to sue for defamation.

References

1957 births
Living people
Chinese volleyball coaches
Sportspeople from Zhangzhou